Emamzadeh Abdollah (also Romanized as Emāmzādeh ‘Abdollāh) is a village in Yateri Rural District, in the Central District of Aradan County, Semnan Province, Iran. At the 2006 census, its population was 193, in 52 families.

References 

Populated places in Aradan County